Constantin Grecu (born 8 June 1988) is a Romanian footballer who plays as a left back.

Honours
Petrolul Ploiești 
Romanian Cup: 2012–13
FC U Craiova 1948
Liga III: 2019–20

External links
 
 

1988 births
Sportspeople from Craiova
Living people
Romanian footballers
Association football defenders
Romania international footballers
Romania under-21 international footballers
Liga I players
Liga II players
CS Pandurii Târgu Jiu players
FC Universitatea Cluj players
FC Petrolul Ploiești players
FC Dinamo București players
Sepsi OSK Sfântu Gheorghe players
FC U Craiova 1948 players